The 1902 Georgia Bulldogs football team represented the Georgia Bulldogs of the University of Georgia during the 1902 Southern Intercollegiate Athletic Association football season. The Bulldogs compiled a 4–2–1 record, including victories over Auburn and Alabama and a 0–0 tie with Georgia Tech. The losses included Georgia's fourth consecutive loss to Sewanee. This was the team's second and final season under the guidance of head coach William A. Reynolds.

Before the season
Frank M. Ridley was captain-elect, Georgia's first two-time captain. He was moved to end from the backfield. One account of Ridley reads "Ridley's first year on the team he played this position so well that Coach Heisman named his as the All-Southern end. He is quick and active and never hesitates to tackle a man, seldom being blocked."

Schedule

Game summaries

Furman
To open the season, Georgia beat Furman 11–0. The game's highlight was an end run for touchdown from Harman.

Georgia Tech
Georgia came in as 6–1 favorites to in-state rival Georgia Tech, and were held to a 0–0 tie. "It's the worst game we have ever played." said captain Ridley. The starting lineup was Bower (left end), Willingham (left tackle), Beaver (left guard), Ketron (center), Nix (right guard), Smith (right tackle), Baxter (right end), Harman (quarterback), Dickinson (left halfback), Ridley (right halfback), Turner (fullback).

Alabama
Alabama was shutout 5–0 at Birmingham. Marvin M. Dickinson scored the only touchdown of the game for Georgia in the second half. Alabama was trying to tie up the game late, but time expired as the Tide reached the Georgia twelve-yard line.

The starting lineup was Bower (left end), McIntosh (left tackle), Beaver (left guard), Ketron (center), Willingham (right guard), Smith (right tackle), Baxter (right end), Harman (quarterback), Dickinson (left halfback), Ridley (right halfback), Turner (fullback).

Davidson
Davidson was defeated 20–0.

Clemson

Sources:

On November 8, Georgia lost to SIAA champion Clemson by a score of 36–0. Despite the score, one writer called it "the hardest fought football game ever seen here." Frank McIntyre, Harman, and Smith all had to be carried off the field.

The starting lineup was Baxter (left end), McIntosh (left tackle), Beaver (left guard), Ketron (center), Willingham (right guard), Smith (right tackle), Ridley (right end), Harman (quarterback), Allen (left halfback), Dickinson (right halfback), Turner (fullback).

Sewanee
Sewanee defeated Georgia 11–0.

Auburn
Georgia upset Auburn 12–5. The same night, Rufus Nalley, great former Georgia star, died. Having learned of Georgia's victory; "He died with a smile on his lips", reported his brother.

Postseason
Ridley was selected an All-Southern  along with teammates Harold Ketron and Sandy Beaver,

References

Additional sources
 

Georgia
Georgia Bulldogs football seasons
Georgia Bulldogs football